The 1983 Tulane Green Wave football team was an American football team that represented Tulane University during the 1983 NCAA Division I-A football season as an independent. In their first year under head coach Wally English, the team compiled a 2–9 record. The Green Wave forfeited their victories over Ole Miss and Florida State after the Supreme Court of the United States declined to hear a case on the eligibility of quarterback Jon English, which resulted in the NCAA ruling of his being ineligible due to failing to follow transfer rules being upheld.

Schedule

References

Tulane
Tulane Green Wave football seasons
Tulane Green Wave football